Camp Polk may refer to

Camp Polk (Oregon) (1865-1866), a former military installation in the U.S. state of Oregon
Fort Polk, a United States Army post located near Leesville, Louisiana
Camp Polk (North Carolina) a World War I United States Army post located near Raleigh, North Carolina home of the Tank Corps, National Army